San Mariano may refer to:

 San Mariano, Corciano, Italy
 San Mariano, Isabela, Philippines
 Maragusan, Davao de Oro, Philippines, whose name is San Mariano until 1988
 San Mariano, deacon and Martyr of the Catholic Church from Grumentum, Ripacandida

See also 
 Mariano, a masculine name